Dolní Krupá is a municipality and village in Havlíčkův Brod District in the Vysočina Region of the Czech Republic. It has about 400 inhabitants.

Administrative parts
The village of Chrast is an administrative part of Dolní Krupá.

References

Villages in Havlíčkův Brod District